Anne-Laure Dalibard is a French mathematician working on asymptotic behavior of fluid equations occurring in oceanographic models. She works as a staff scientist at the Jacques-Louis Lions Laboratory, a joint research unit between Sorbonne University and the French National Centre for Scientific Research (UMR 7598.)

Education and career 
Dalibard earned her PhD from Sorbonne University, working on the homogenization of scalar conservation laws and transport equations under the supervision of Fields medal laureate Pierre-Louis Lions.

Awards and honours 
 2020 Société Mathématique de France Maurice Audin Prize 
 2018 CNRS bronze medal
 2015 European Research Council starting grant
 2010 College de France Peccot Prize

External links
Anne-Laure Dalibard – Sorbonne University

References 

Living people
French mathematicians
Paris-Sorbonne University alumni
French National Centre for Scientific Research awards
Year of birth missing (living people)